Jan Matsobane "Malombo" Lechaba (born 27 July 1960) is a retired South African football (soccer) midfielder who last played for Mamelodi Sundowns. Lechaba represented South Africa in 1977 versus Rhodesia.

References

1960 births
Living people
Kaizer Chiefs F.C. players
Mamelodi Sundowns F.C. players
S.C. Beira-Mar players
Primeira Liga players
Liga Portugal 2 players
Association football midfielders
South African soccer players
South African expatriate soccer players
Soccer players from Pretoria
South Africa international soccer players
Expatriate footballers in Portugal
South African expatriate sportspeople in Portugal
Pretoria Callies F.C. players